Gotsob is a rural locality (a selo) in Gergebilsky District, Republic of Dagestan, Russia. The population was 164 as of 2010. There are 8 streets.

Geography 
Gotsob is located 31 km northwest of Gergebil (the district's administrative centre) by road. Orkachi and Novaya Butsra are the nearest rural localities.

References 

Rural localities in Gergebilsky District